The 2007 UAW-DaimlerChrysler 400 was the third stock car race of the 2007 NASCAR Nextel Cup Series and the 10th iteration of the event. The race was held on Sunday, March 11, 2007, before an audience of 156,000 in North Las Vegas, Nevada at Las Vegas Motor Speedway, a  permanent D-shaped oval racetrack. The race took the scheduled 267 laps to complete. In the final laps of the race, Hendrick Motorsports driver Jimmie Johnson would manage to mount a late-race charge to the front, passing for the lead with 28 laps to go in the race to take his 24th career NASCAR Nextel Cup Series victory and his first victory of the season. To fill out the top three, Hendrick Motorsports driver Jeff Gordon and Joe Gibbs Racing driver Denny Hamlin would finish second and third, respectively.

Background 

Las Vegas Motor Speedway, located in Clark County, Nevada in Las Vegas, Nevada about 15 miles northeast of the Las Vegas Strip, is a  complex of multiple tracks for motorsports racing. The complex is owned by Speedway Motorsports, Inc., which is headquartered in Charlotte, North Carolina.

Entry list 

 (R) denotes rookie driver.

Practice

First practice 
The first practice session was held on Friday, March 9, at 2:30 PM EST. The session would last for one hour and 30 minutes.

Second practice 
The second practice session was held on Saturday, March 10, at 12:00 PM EST. The session would last for 50 minutes.

Final practice 
The final practice session, sometimes referred to as Happy Hour, was held on Saturday, March 10, at 1:20 PM EST. The session would last for one hour.

Qualifying 
Qualifying was held on Friday, March 9, at 6:10 PM EST. Each driver would have two laps to set a fastest time; the fastest of the two would count as their official qualifying lap. While positions 1-42 would be determined by qualifying speed, the top 35 teams in owner's points would be assured that they would earn a spot in the field if they had managed to make an effort to qualify.  The remaining seven positions from positions 36-42 would be assigned to those drivers with the fastest qualifying speeds whose car owners are not among the top 35. The final starting position, position 43, can be utilized by a car owner whose driver is a current or past NASCAR NEXTEL Cup champion who participated as a driver during the current of previous season and was entered in the event for that owner in that car prior to the entry deadline. In the case that iff there was more than one series champion vying for the position, it would be given to the most recent series champion. If the final provisional starting position is not filled by a current or past series champion, it will be assigned to the next eligible car owner according to qualifying results.

Ten drivers would fail to qualify.

Full qualifying results

Race results

Standings after the race 

Drivers' Championship standings

Note: Only the first 12 positions are included for the driver standings.

References

UAW-DaimlerChrysler 400
NASCAR races at Las Vegas Motor Speedway
2007 in sports in Nevada
March 2007 sports events in the United States